The MTV Australia Awards 2008 is the new title for the Australian MTV Awards previously known as the MTV Australia Video Music Awards. The show was held at Sydney's Australian Technology Park in Redfern on 26 April 2008 and aired live on MTV Australia and Fox8 on the Foxtel, Austar and Optus platforms in Australia and 28 April on SKY Digital in New Zealand.

History
Voting commenced on 12 March 2008 and concluded on 25 April 2008. Unlike previous shows, it included, for the first time, Best Australian and Best New Zealand artist award as well as Music Video of the year, Television Moment, Live Performer, Good and Bad Karma awards, the Re-Make award which allowed viewer's to re-film a moment in television in their own style. MTV New Zealand hosted the second Mile High Gig which flew Kiwi fans via Air New Zealand to the award's show with special guests performing on board including Dizzee Rascal and Scribe. The show was hosted by Wyclef Jean. Part of the years line-up were Academy Award nominee Juliette Lewis and her band Juliette & The Licks, Grammy Award winner Eve and 50 Cent. MTV Australia, were seeking Lindsay Lohan to be a guest of honour at the awards show but she later had to cancel her appearance due to film commitments. The show also had special awards which included the "Movie Star Award" which was awarded to actor Matt Damon, originally meant to be presented by Mischa Barton but was instead presented by 50 Cent and G Unit; "International Music Artist of the Year", awarded to Timbaland and presented by The Veronicas and the "Sport Award" for surfer Mick Fanning presented by Ian Thorpe. The show was aired across 19 countries.

Performers
 The Veronicas
 Dizzee Rascal
 The Potbelleez
 Eve
 Juliette & The Licks
 Wyclef Jean
The Vines

Presenters
 Andrew Hansen
 Brian McFadden
 Eve
 James Ash
 Julian Morrow
 Juliette Lewis
 Leona Lewis
 Mischa Barton
 Natalie Bassingthwaighte
 Merrick and Rosso (Red Carpet Hosts)
 The Veronicas

Winners and nominees

Special awards

Movie Star Award
 Matt Damon

Sport's Award
 Mick Fanning

International Music Artist of the Year
 Timbaland

Notes

External links
 The Official MTV Australia Awards Website

2008 in Australian music
2008 music awards
2000s in Sydney
MTV Australia Awards